Galatasaray SK Men's 1932–1933 season is the 1932–1933 basketball season for Turkish professional basketball club Galatasaray SK.

Depth chart

Regular season

Pts=Points, Pld=Matches played, W=Matches won, L=Matches lost

Matches
1st Half

References

Galatasaray Sports Club 1932–33 season